Stephen Wright (born 6 March 1961) is a former Australian rules footballer who played for the Sydney Swans in the Victorian/Australian Football League.

Wright won Sydney's best and fairest award in 1985 and 1990. 

In 1996 and 1997, Wright was coach of Central District, in the South Australian National Football League.

He coached the Highett Football Club in 2007 and 2008 in the Southern Football League. In 2010, he became the Southern Football League senior interleague coach.

He has coached Murrumbeena in the Southern Football Netball League since 2014.

References

1961 births
Living people
Australian rules footballers from Victoria (Australia)
Sydney Swans players
Victorian State of Origin players
Bob Skilton Medal winners
Central District Football Club coaches
Clarence Football Club coaches
New South Wales Australian rules football State of Origin players
Australia international rules football team players
Clarence Football Club players